

List of Ambassadors

Reda Mansour (Non-Resident, Panama City) 2018 - 
Mordehai Amihai-Bivas (Non-Resident) 2015 - 2018
Chanan Olami (Non-Resident, Caracas)  1987 - 1991
Mordechai Palzur (Non-Resident, Santo Domingo) 1982 - 1986
Moshe Liba (Non-Resident, Caracas) 1978
Victor Eliachar (Non-Resident, Caracas) 1974 - 1977
Jacob Doron (Non-Resident, Caracas) 1967 - 1971
Eliashiv Ben-Horin (Non-Resident, Caracas) 1963 - 1967
Arie Oron (Non-Resident, Caracas) 1961 - 1963

References

Trinidad and Tobago
Israel